Graham Barry Dunlop (born 21 May 1976, in Glasgow) is a Scottish field hockey player.

Dunlop was a member of the Great Britain and Northern Ireland Hockey squad that finished ninth at the 2004 Olympics in Athens, Greece.

He is now the Head of Stuart House and teaches physical education at Hutchesons' Grammar School, Glasgow, where he explores his newfound football and basketball skills.

External links
 
https://web.archive.org/web/20121104201701/http://www.sports-reference.com/olympics/athletes/du/graham-dunlop-1.html sports-reference
profile

1976 births
Living people
Scottish male field hockey players
Olympic field hockey players of Great Britain
British male field hockey players
Field hockey players at the 2004 Summer Olympics
Field hockey players at the 2006 Commonwealth Games
Field hockey players from Glasgow
Commonwealth Games competitors for Scotland